San Lorenzo del Flumen is a locality located in the municipality of Lalueza, in Huesca province, Aragon, Spain. As of 2020, it has a population of 313.

Geography 
San Lorenzo del Flumen is located 53km southeast of Huesca.

References

Populated places in the Province of Huesca